"Rest in Metal" is the fourth episode of the American murder mystery comedy-drama television series Poker Face. The episode was written by Christine Boylan and directed by Tiffany Johnson. It was released on Peacock on January 26, 2023, alongside "Dead Man's Hand", "The Night Shift", and "The Stall".

The series follows Charlie Cale, a woman with the ability to detect if people are lying. After using her ability to win poker tournaments, she is caught by a powerful casino owner in Laughlin. Rather than banning her from his casino, he gives her a job as a waitress. After her friend is found dead, Charlie uncovers a plot where the owner's son ordered her murder to protect a powerful client. She is now on the run after exposing the casino, with head of security Cliff going after her. The episode follows Charlie as a merch seller for a washed-up heavy metal band, Doxxxology. When the new drummer dies in an accident during a performance, Charlie finds that his death may not have been an accident.

The episode received positive reviews from critics, who praised the writing, performances (particularly Lyonne, Sevigny, and Cirillo) and tension.

Plot
Now an employee at big-box hardware store, Ruby Ruin (Chloë Sevigny), vocalist of the early-90s one-hit wonder heavy metal band Doxxxology, recruits Gavin (Nicholas Cirillo) as a temporary drummer for a summer tour. She, guitarist Al (John Darnielle) and bassist Eskie (G.K. Umeh) attempt to write a song recapturing the success of their hit song "Staplehead," but are constantly frustrated by Gavin's incessant drumming and distractible personality. During a performance, Gavin is slapped by Ruby for stealing her scream note. Ruby apologizes later at their hotel; Gavin then performs a song he has drafted, "Sucker Punch," to the band members. Stunned by the song's "hit" quality and embittered that the royalties from "Staplehead" go to their previous drummer, the band conspires to steal the song from him, firing their roadie Deuteronomy (Chuck Cooper) and rigging Gavin's amplifier to electrocute him during the climactic scream of "Staplehead". They then rewrite and sign the lyrics and burn Gavin's original lyric sheet.

A few days prior, Ruby hires Charlie (Natasha Lyonne) as the band's merch seller/roadie. She begins to bond with Gavin, noticing that he never wears shoes, has a camera pointed at his kick drum, and writes lyrics spontaneously based on his surroundings. After the stapler incident, she scolds Ruby for slapping Gavin, prompting her to apologize. The next day, she witnesses Gavin's death on stage after taking a Polaroid of the climactic moment. Charlie picks up on Ruby's lie when she says that the band "got lucky" to the coroner, who rules Gavin's death as an equipment malfunction. While the band records Gavin's song the next day at a studio in Kenosha, Wisconsin, Charlie meets a woman (Emily Yoshida) who hosts a true crime podcast named Murder Girl.

The band then arrives in Milwaukee, where they will open for a band named Krampus. While cleaning her car, Charlie realizes that the lyrics to "Sucker Punch" correspond to advertising slogans on items in Gavin's pockets. When questioned by Charlie, Ruby admits that Gavin wrote the song but insists that she needs a new hit in her career. Questioning Deuteronomy, Charlie learns that modern amps usually have three prongs as a safety measure. Finding Gavin's amp in the trailer, she notices that it has three prongs and an older, unsafe model was used on stage when Gavin was murdered.

Charlie overhears Al practicing a new song titled "You Can't Un-Murder Someone." She voices her suspicion of Al to Ruby, who dismisses it. Finally, Charlie uses Gavin's footwork camera to confirm that the band wore thick-soled Doc Martens during the performance to avoid electrocution. She confronts the band about killing Gavin, but Ruby fires her.

Charlie learns that a video of her punching Krampus's lead singer has gone viral. Cliff (Benjamin Bratt) suddenly appears and chases her; she escapes into the concert and succeeds in escaping. As "Sucker Punch" leads to renewed interest in Doxxxology, the members prepare to sign a recording contract. However, a recording executive reveals that the rhythm track to "Sucker Punch", which the band failed to modify from Gavin's original draft, is stolen from the theme song for the sitcom Benson, resulting in a severe copyright infringement case. Murder Girl, tipped off by Charlie, bases her next episode on Doxxxology's crimes.

Production

Development
The series was announced in March 2021, with Rian Johnson serving as creator, writer, director and executive producer. Johnson stated that the series would delve into "the type of fun, character driven, case-of-the-week mystery goodness I grew up watching." The episode was directed by Tiffany Johnson, while Christine Boylan wrote it. This was Johnson's first directing credit and Boylan's first writing credit. Boylan worked in making sure that every detail of the episode added to an impact of the story, saying "My motto is 'use everything'. Use every piece of furniture around you. If there's a bottle of water, then what's interesting about that bottle? Use it somehow. And if it doesn't work, you can cut it out."

Casting
The announcement of the series included that Natasha Lyonne would serve as the main lead actress. She was approached by Johnson about working on a procedural project together, with Lyonne as the lead character. As Johnson explained, the role was "completely cut to measure for her." Benjamin Bratt also joined the series in the recurring role of Cliff, whose character chases Charlie after she ran away from the casino in the previous episode.

Due to the series' procedural aspects, the episodes feature several guest stars. Johnson was inspired by the amount of actors who guest starred on Columbo, wanting to deem each guest star as the star of the episode, which allowed them to attract many actors. The episode featured appearances by Chloë Sevigny and Nicholas Cirillo, who were announced to guest star in June 2022. The episode also featured an appearance by John Darnielle, who also worked in writing the songs of the episode.

Critical reception
"Rest in Metal" received extremely positive reviews from critics. Saloni Gajjar of The A.V. Club gave the episode an "A−" grade and wrote, "How often can Charlie find herself in a situation where a stranger she meets ends up six feet into the ground? But it's still early into the show, so I'm not complaining. The Columbo-esque gimmick is paying off richly. I'm thrilled there are six more episodes of Charlie finding herself in a mess she has to dig herself out of."

Alan Sepinwall wrote, "It's also the one of these four that most effectively uses the Knives Out/Glass Onion rewind gimmick, as seeing Charlie hanging out with the doomed drummer adds even more value to her desire to catch his killers than the glimpses of her friendship with Natalie do in "Dead Man's Hand". And the payoff to the drummer's seemingly random Benson love is, like the trash can bit in "The Night Shift", a great bit of sleight of hand. As the playwright Anton Chekhov once wrote, if you put a Robert Guillaume sitcom on the screen in act one..." Amanda Whiting of Vulture gave the episode a 4 star rating out of 5 and wrote, "Of the initial episode drop, "Rest in Metal" is the first in which the crime feels genuinely 'getawaywithable' to me. Some of that might be because Ruby, thanks to Sevigny's steely interpretation of what it looks like to be a woman in despair, is the first killer we've met who really seems to have her whole heart in the game."

See also
Zooropa, a song by U2 whose lyrics are also a series of advertising slogans

References

External links
 

Poker Face (TV series) episodes
2023 American television episodes
Television episodes set in Wisconsin